The 1934 Constantine riots was an anti-Jewish riot that erupted in the Algerian city of Constantine. The background of the tension between Jews and Muslims in the city was rooted in the different manner in which Jews and Muslims had been treated in the Algerian state by the French colonial government. It is uncertain what the exact cause of the riots was, though various accounts suggest that the riots were triggered by an altercation between a Jewish man and some Muslims at the Sidi Lakhdar Mosque in Constantine.  Multiple sources report that 25 Jews and 3 Muslims died over the course of the three-day riot, and several Jewish establishments were pillaged. The events have also been described as a pogrom.

Background 
 

The 1934 Constantine riots can be contextualized by the rising antisemitism in French Algeria. One source of the tension was the Crémieux Decree, which was implemented in October 1870, and allowed for Algerian Jews to gain French citizenship. For the French government, this decree was considered part of the so-called "civilizing mission" in North Africa. Various French parties and individuals were against this decision, and many of the reasons were rooted in antisemitism or xenophobia more generally. One of the reasons for the French to oppose the decree was that they believed that the Jews were more suitable for commercial jobs, and they were afraid that French citizenship would allow more Jews into the French military. Many right-wing, radical French nationalists agreed with Charles du Bouzet's claim that the Algerian Jews were simply incompatible with Western civilization. Du Bouzet, the former prefect of Oran and special commissioner to Algeria, noted that it was the Algerian Jews' "morals, language and clothing" that made them Arab, hence different from the French. The radical French nationalists saw the gradual political inclusion and assimilation of the Algerian Jews into the French community as a threat to the "native" French society. There were spikes in antisemitism in Algeria in the early 20th century. For instance, Dr Jules Molle, who spearheaded the antisemitic Unions Latines movement, became the mayor of Oran in 1925 and became the city's deputy in 1928. Abbé Gabriel Lambert, who claimed that the political left promoted "Jewish imperialism", became Oran's mayor in 1934. Local newspapers in both Oran and Constantine, Le Petit Oranais and La Tribune, respectively, regularly propagated antisemitic messages. Evidence suggests that the antisemitic French settler population attempted to instill antisemitic sentiments in the Muslim Algerian population and induce altercations between Constantine's Muslims and Jews. Based on contemporary press and police reports, there is no evidence that antisemitic messages were publicly propagated by the local Muslim politicians or clerics in the 1920s and 1930s.  
	
There was also wide belief that Nazis instigated it.

Timeline 

The cause of the Constantine pogrom has been debated for some time. The general consensus is that the initial cause of the conflict was a confrontation between Eliahou Khalifa, a Jewish Zouave, and Muslim worshippers at the Sidi Lakhdar Mosque on August 3rd, 1934. The Muslims said that Khalifa was drunk, and insulted Islam. A report by the Jewish authorities claimed he was not intoxicated, and that after getting into an argument with them, the Muslims had cursed Khalifa's faith and he cursed them and their faith back. The French colonial authorities only reported the Muslim version of events, which most scholars believe instigated the pogrom. Other accounts explain that Khalifa had urinated outside on the mosque's wall, which would have instigated the riots. In the evening of August 3rd, a Muslim man was shot in the stomach during the violent demonstrations that ensued at Khalifa's apartment. A total of 148 French soldiers and 52 police agents were sent to contain the riots in the city.

On Saturday 4 August, the riots continued as local leaders and representatives of the Muslim and Jewish communities gathered with police and military representatives to seek a peaceful end to the violence. 

On Sunday 5 August, violence broke out again after rumors of an assassination on a local Muslim politician, Mohamed Salah Bendjelloul, spread. However, the rumors turned out to be false. The riots lasted several hours and also spread to towns in the vicinity of Constantine. The Constantine division of the International League Against Racism and Anti-Semitism (LICRA) hung up posters, both in Arabic and French, calling for peace and an end to the violence.

The riots resulted in the death of 25 Jews and 3 Muslims, roughly 200 people were injured, and several Jewish businesses and homes were also destroyed or looted.

Contemporary reporting
JTA reported on August 8, 1934:

See also
1934 Thrace pogroms
Algerian Jews
History of the Jews in Algeria
Antisemitism
Antisemitism in the Arab world

References

1934 in Algeria
1934 riots
August 1934 events
Anti-Jewish pogroms by Muslims
Jewish Algerian history
Mass murder in 1934
1934 in Judaism
1934 murders in Algeria
Antisemitism in Algeria